Jakob Benjamin Lee Junis (born September 16, 1992) is an American professional baseball pitcher for the San Francisco Giants of Major League Baseball (MLB).  He was drafted by the Kansas City Royals in the 29th round of the 2011 Major League Baseball draft, and made his MLB debut with them in 2017.

Amateur career
Junis attended Rock Falls High School in Rock Falls, Illinois, and graduated in 2011. There, he earned all-state honors in both baseball and basketball. As a senior, in basketball he averaged 19 points a game. In baseball he threw an 88-92 mph fastball and had a 1.10 ERA and 93 strikeouts as a pitcher, while batting .485 with 54 RBIs.

The Kansas City Royals selected Junis in the 29th round of the 2011 Major League Baseball draft. He had committed to play college baseball at North Carolina State University as an infielder and a pitcher, and though he was rated as a fourth round pick he fell to the 29th round because of his scholarship to North Carolina State. But he signed with the Royals for a $675,000 signing bonus instead of attending college.

Professional career

Kansas City Royals
Junis made his professional debut in 2012 with the Burlington Royals with whom he went 2–2 with a 4.15 ERA in seven games (six starts). He pitched in 2013 with the Idaho Falls Chukars, posted a 2–6 record and 7.39 ERA in 13 starts, and was 8th in the Pioneer League with 55 strikeouts.

In 2014 he played with the Lexington Legends, and had a 9–8 record and 4.30 ERA with 10 hit batsmen (5th in the South Atlantic League) and a WHIP of 1.28 (10th in the league) in 26 games (22 starts). Junis pitched for the Wilmington Blue Rocks (with whom he was 2nd in the Carolina League with 123 strikeouts, and third in WHIP (1.12)) and Northwest Arkansas Naturals in 2015, where he compiled a combined 5–12 record and 3.78 ERA in 27 starts.

He started 2016 with Northwest Arkansas, for whom he was 9-7 with a 3.25 ERA (3rd in the Texas League) and 117 strikeouts (6th in the league) in 21 starts, was 4th in the league in WHIP (1.15), and was a Texas League Mid-Season All Star and Post-Season All Star. In August he was promoted to the Omaha Storm Chasers, with whom he had six starts. In 27 combined starts between Northwest Arkansas and Omaha he was 10–10 with a 4.05 ERA, and 143 strikeouts and 34 walks in 149 innings, as he generally threw a fastball in the low-90s and occasionally slightly higher, a change-up, and a curveball. He was named an MiLB.com Organization All Star. The Royals added him to their 40-man roster after the 2016 season.

Junis made his MLB debut on April 12, 2017. After his debut, he was recalled and optioned a number of times before he was called up to Kansas City for the remainder of the season on August 14. In 12 starts for Omaha he was 3–5 with a 2.92 ERA, in 20 games (16 starts). For Kansas City, he compiled a 9–3 record and 4.30 ERA, as his 9 hit batsmen were 10th-most in the league.

Junis began 2018 in Kansas City's starting rotation. He finished the season with a 9–12 record, a complete game, and a 4.37 ERA in 30 starts, and was 3rd in the AL in hit batsmen (15; a team record), 8th in walks per 9 innings (2.186), and 10th in strikeouts/walk (3.814) and wild pitches (9).

In 2019 for the Royals, Junis pitched to a 5.24 ERA with a 8.4 K/9 and 3.0 BB/9 in 175 1/3 innings across 31 starts, and was 6th in the AL with 11 hit batsmen. He became the first pitcher in the major leagues to win at least nine games in each of his first three seasons since Masahiro Tanaka (2014–16); the last pitcher younger than Junis to do that was Gerrit Cole (2013–15).

With the 2020 Kansas City Royals, Junis appeared in eight games (six starts). He compiled an 0-2 record with a 6.39 ERA and 6 walks and 19 strikeouts in 25.1 innings pitched. He was on the injured list twice.

Junis made 16 appearances (six starts) for the Royals in 2021, posting a 5.26 ERA with 41 strikeouts in 39.1 innings of work, and was on the injured list twice. His salary was $1.7 million. On November 5, 2021, Junis was outrighted off of the 40-man roster, but rejected the outright assignment and elected free agency.

San Francisco Giants
On March 14, 2022, Junis signed a one-year $1.75 million deal with the San Francisco Giants.

In 2022 with the Giants he was 5-7 with a 4.42 ERA in 112 innings, as in 23 games (17 starts) he walked 25 batters and had 98 strikeouts. In 15.1 innings in the minor leagues, he pitched 11.1 innings, giving up 11 earned runs.

On January 13, 2023, Junis agreed to a one-year, $2.8 million contract with the Giants, avoiding salary arbitration.

Personal
Junis and his wife, Brianne, have three children together. They reside in Scottsdale, Arizona.

References

External links

1992 births
Living people
People from Rock Falls, Illinois
Baseball players from Illinois
Major League Baseball pitchers
Kansas City Royals players
San Francisco Giants players
Burlington Royals players
Idaho Falls Chukars players
Lexington Legends players
Wilmington Blue Rocks players
Northwest Arkansas Naturals players
Omaha Storm Chasers players
Sacramento River Cats players